Penrhyn Stanley Adamson, known as Penrhyn Stanlaws, (1877–1957) was a cover artist and film director. Sydney Adamson, who also became an illustrator, was his older brother.

Career

He was born in Dundee, Scotland.

A successful cover artist, he picked Anna Q. Nilsson to become one of his models. He selected female models who toured by automobile to promote Liberty Loans.

Stanlaws organized a syndicate to build the Hotel des Artistes at 1 West 67th with a large penthouse studio. He also planned a resort in Port Washington on Long Island but it was never built.

He was a fan of the looks of Madge Bellamy.

Gallery

Filmography
The House That Jazz Built (1921)
At the End of the World (1921)
The Little Minister (1921 film)
Singed Wings (1922)
The Law and the Woman (1922)
The Wiser Sex (1922)
Pink Gods (1922)

References

External links

American film directors
20th-century American painters
1877 births
1957 deaths
Artists from Dundee